The Yellow Cab Company was a taxicab company in Chicago which was founded in 1907 by John D. Hertz.

In 1920 the Yellow Cab Manufacturing Company was formed to manufacture taxicabs.

During the 1910s and 1920s the company was involved in considerable illegal activity relating to mobsters and in particular to the Chicago Outfit. Yellow Cab was involved in a bitter rivalry wit Checker Taxi at the time which led to a number of shootings, deaths, and firebombings.

By 1925 the company was a subsidiary of the Chicago Yellow Cab Company, a public holding company with shares equally divided between Hertz, Parmelee, and a small group of other investors. Hertz sold the Yellow Cab Manufacturing Company to General Motors in 1925. 

He sold his remaining interest in the Yellow Cab Company in 1929 to Morris Markin, who had established Checker Cab Manufacturing Company as a driver cooperative with the Checker Taxi. Hertz had decided to focus on car rentals (later Hertz Rent-a-Car which incidentally still uses a yellow logo). The sale was also prompted by the violence associated with the business that culminated in 1928 in his racing stables being destroyed in a $200,000 fire in which 11 thoroughbred horses were burned.

From 1930 till 1982 Yellow Cab of Chicago sourced all of their operating taxicab fleet from Markin's Checker Motors Corp. of Kalamazoo, Michigan.  Holding a near monopoly of taxicab operations in Chicago, the majority of Chicago taxicabs were largely purpose built Checker Cabs spanning three generations.

Yellow Cab Co. was sold again in 1996 to Patton Corrigan, who in turn sold controlling interest in 2005 to Michael Levine, a third-generation taxicab operator from New York City. The Levine/Corrigan group has also purchased the Checker Taxi Affiliation in Chicago, to reunite the two companies once again. In 2015, Yellow Cab of Chicago filed for bankruptcy. Yellow Cab Co eventually split into multiple companies across the nation bearing the Yellow Cab name. In January 2016, San Francisco's Yellow Cab cooperative filed for bankruptcy protection.

Since the bankruptcy, many of the companies that continue to carry the Yellow Cab name have struggled to compete with rideshare services such as Uber and Lyft that have drivers use their own personal vehicles for services traditionally provided by Yellow Cab and generally have much lower fares than traditional taxicabs. In some cities such as Pittsburgh, Yellow Cab has even changed their business model to match ridesharing services by having a smartphone app and even converting their drivers from employees to independent contractors while still being able to hail down a taxicab in the traditional sense.

References

 
Transport companies established in 1907
Taxi companies
1907 establishments in Illinois